"Burger Kings" is the 18th episode of the thirty-second season of the American animated television series The Simpsons and the 702nd episode overall. Airing on April 11, 2021, the episode is directed by Lance Kramer and written by Rob LaZebnik.

Plot
When Mr. Burns' chef brings him a food he does not like the taste of, Burns almost kills himself after eating Krusty Burgers and learns that everyone in Springfield would prefer that he had died. With Burns about to give up on life, Smithers helps his boss with both his image and newfound love of burgers by suggesting Burns get into the plant-based burger business, showing him an exotic plant-made burger that Professor Frink's robot created. Soon, Burns has the Simpson family and the whole town aboard, and Burns appoints Homer as the spokesman and hires him to film commercials for the chain on a green screen.

Meanwhile, Marge accidentally uses Alexa to buy the ever-rising stock in Burns' new company, X-Cell-Ent Burger. On the news, Kent Brockman announces the competition war between X-Cell-Ent Burger and Krusty Burger. Bart sees Krusty Burger failing due to Burns's success, even when Krusty the Clown tries making his own new burger, and tries to get Lisa to help, but she does not believe that Burns' new venture is evil, until she suddenly realizes that Burns' burgers are made from endangered plant species from the Amazon Rainforest.

Lisa goes to Homer, but he refuses due to him being his own boss. At night, Homer has a dream about what Lisa said and is convinced to change his mind. At the national rollout, after some reminders from Burns and Smithers on the words he can use, Homer and Lisa manage to use them against Burns, scandalizing the people, while Krusty regains his fame and Marge regains the money she was going to lose after selling her stocks. Driving away with Smithers, Burns is happy that in the end, the town hates him again, having grown tired of good acts.

Production
The episode's title, along with the writing and directorial credits of Kramer and LaZebnik were revealed on February 2, 2021. After a week-long break in the season's release, it was revealed that airing would resume on April 11 on March 29.

Reception
Commenting on the expression of Mr. Burns' evilness in the episode, Den of Geek said "[The Simpsons] still finds a way to twist it further. Once you’re known for doing something good you have to continue doing good things. He’s no longer crushed by morality. Evil always wins, and he’s even planning on opening a school for the blind so he can convince them aliens have landed." Tony Sokol gave the episode five out of five stars.

References

External links
 "Burger Kings" on IMDb

2021 American television episodes
The Simpsons (season 32) episodes